Barnegat is an unincorporated community and census-designated place (CDP) located within Barnegat Township, in Ocean County, New Jersey, United States. As of the 2010 United States Census, the CDP's population was 2,817.

Geography
According to the United States Census Bureau, the CDP had a total area of 2.667 square miles (6.908 km2), including 2.655 square miles (6.875 km2) of land and 0.012 square miles (0.032 km2) of water (0.47%).

Demographics

Census 2010

Census 2000
As of the 2000 United States Census there were 1,690 people, 595 households, and 443 families living in the CDP. The population density was 243.5/km2 (631.1/mi2). There were 640 housing units at an average density of 92.2/km2 (239.0/mi2). The racial makeup of the CDP was 95.68% White, 0.53% African American, 0.12% Native American, 1.30% Asian, 0.65% from other races, and 1.72% from two or more races. Hispanic or Latino of any race were 2.72% of the population.

There were 595 households, out of which 39.7% had children under the age of 18 living with them, 61.2% were married couples living together, 9.2% had a female householder with no husband present, and 25.5% were non-families. 18.8% of all households were made up of individuals, and 8.2% had someone living alone who was 65 years of age or older. The average household size was 2.84 and the average family size was 3.31.

In the CDP the population was spread out, with 29.2% under the age of 18, 7.3% from 18 to 24, 29.9% from 25 to 44, 24.3% from 45 to 64, and 9.3% who were 65 years of age or older. The median age was 37 years. For every 100 females, there were 105.8 males. For every 100 females age 18 and over, there were 101.5 males.

The median income for a household in the CDP was $55,040, and the median income for a family was $59,100. Males had a median income of $36,755 versus $24,500 for females. The per capita income for the CDP was $21,431. About 2.6% of families and 6.0% of the population were below the poverty line, including 6.4% of those under age 18 and 5.9% of those age 65 or over.

References 

Barnegat Township, New Jersey
Census-designated places in Ocean County, New Jersey